Vicia palaestina, the Palestine vetch, is a species of flowering plant in the family Fabaceae. It is native to the eastern Mediterranean region; Greece, the Aegean Islands, Turkey, Cyprus, the Levant, Sinai, and Iraq. Carbonized remains of its seeds have been tentatively identified in Mousterian Neanderthal deposits in Kebara Cave, Mount Carmel, Israel. Unlike many species of vetch, its seeds are non-toxic, and are edible even when raw.

References

palaestina
Flora of Greece
Flora of the East Aegean Islands
Flora of Turkey
Flora of Cyprus
Flora of Lebanon
Flora of Syria
Flora of Palestine (region)
Flora of Sinai
Flora of Iraq
Plants described in 1849